Silva Sociedad Deportiva is a Spanish football team based in A Coruña, in the autonomous community of Galicia. Founded on 6 June 1940 it currently plays in Tercera División RFEF – Group 1, holding home games at Campo de Fútbol Grela, which has a capacity of 1,000 spectators.

Season to season

7 seasons in Tercera División
1 season in Tercera División RFEF

Honours

Primeira Autonómica: 2011–12
Segunda Autonómica: 2010–11
Terceira Autonómica: 1996–97

References

External links
Official website 
Futbolme team profile 
Arefe Regional team profile 

Football clubs in Galicia (Spain)
Association football clubs established in 1940
1940 establishments in Spain